Victoria F. Samanidou (born 1963) is a Greek analytical chemist. She is a professor at Aristotle University of Thessaloniki in Thessaloniki, Greece.

Early life 

She was born in Thessaloniki in 1963.

Career 

She is a professor at Aristotle University of Thessaloniki in Thessaloniki, Greece.

Personal life 

She has two daughters.

Achievements and honours

References

External links 

 Lab page
  Samanidou's staff page at Chemistry School website

Greek chemists
Analytical chemists
Academic staff of the Aristotle University of Thessaloniki
1963 births
Scientists from Thessaloniki
Living people